Yahualica is a town and municipality in the northeastern part of Jalisco, Mexico. It is one of the 125 municipalities that make up the state of Jalisco.

Yahualica covers some 520.75 square kilometers and shares borders with the state of Zacatecas.

The name Yahualica is thought to be derived from the indigenous roots of the Nahuas. It may be from "ayahuitl" meaning fog and "calli" meaning house, making Yahualica "the house of fog." Another proposed translation of Ayahuitl is "place surrounded by water" or "the round place".

History
1165: The region's inhabitants were the Tecuexes, who later fought the Aztecs for  control of the territory.

1530s : The Spanish, led by Cristóbal de Oñate, conquered the region.

1824: Yahualica was constituted a municipality .

Transportation
Yahualica is served by bus and taxi services, as well as highways leading into and out of Yahualica and throughout the city.  The highway transit system includes Fed 71 and Jal 225 (Jal 225) which run entirely in the municipality.  Fed 78, southbound, leads to Tepatitlán/Cuquío and northbound to Nochistlán/Aguascalientes. Jal 225 runs east towards the ranchos of Huisquilco, El Durazno, San Isidro, and Pastores.

The closest airports to Yahualica are Aguascalientes International Airport ( away) and Guadalajara International Airport ( away), each about a two-hour drive.

Economy 
Stockbreeding: Cattle, horses, and pigs are raised.

Gastronomy: Yahualica's traditions include birria, spicy salsa, tostadas, and candy from that region.Chile de Arbol: The producers of this chile pepper say that Yahualica has the best one in the world because of its taste and spice. This chile is possible thanks to the soil in this region, the climate, and the techniques the producers in the area have been practicing for years. The economy of around 300 families in this municipality depend on the production of chile de arbol. Other than that, there are more than one dozen industries that produce hot sauces that are utilized in many ways in Mexican households. Agriculture: Includes corn, sorghum, oats, chili, beans, and peaches.

Commerce: Establishments dedicated to the sale of products of necessity and mixed businesses that sell diverse goods

Industry: The main activity is technology and manufacturing

Services: Many are provided: professional, financial, administrative, technical, social, tourist, personal, and maintenance

Forestry: Oak plants

Mining: Deposits of manganese exist

Fishing: Carp and tilapia are captured.

Cultural and tourist attractions 
Architecture
 Main square plaza 
 Toledo hotel
 Benito Juárez theater 
 Parroquia de San Miguel Arcángel Catholic church (pictured to the right)

Restaurants 
 Sushido
 La HierbaBuena
 Gabacho's Pizzeria Yahualica
 NUS
 La Pequeña Italia
 Stella-Maris
 El Herradero 
Waterpark: Sun and Water Resort This resort complex, which opened in 2011, offers recreational areas with slides, a water boat, an event terrace and a snack area. The resort's Hotel Sun and Water is walking distance from the waterpark. The resort's restaurant, La Gran Laguna serves meats and fresh seafood in a variety of plates, and offers a view of the entire resort.

Sports 
Yahualica has a soccer/futbol team in the Third Division of Mexico, Club Deportivo De Los Altos.

El Club Deportivo Gallos is the soccer team that represents the municipality in Third Division of Mexico, local and state tournaments.

People from Yahualica

José González Gallo, politician
Juan Sandoval Íñiguez, Roman Catholic cardinal
Antonio Martínez, footballer
Martín Vásquez, footballer

Yahualica in fiction
Yahualica is the setting for the novel Al filo del agua, written by Agustín Yáñez.

Government

Municipal presidents

References

Municipalities of Jalisco